High Speed is a 1917 American silent comedy film directed by George L. Sargent and Elmer Clifton and starring Jack Mulhall, Fritzi Ridgeway and Harry L. Rattenberry.

Cast
 Jack Mulhall as 'Speed' Cannon
 Fritzi Ridgeway as Susan
 Harry L. Rattenberry as Father 
 Lydia Yeamans Titus as Mother
 Albert MacQuarrie as Count Englantine
 J. Morris Foster as Count's Friend

References

Bibliography
 Robert B. Connelly. The Silents: Silent Feature Films, 1910-36, Volume 40, Issue 2. December Press, 1998.

External links
 

1917 films
1917 comedy films
1910s English-language films
American silent feature films
Silent American comedy films
American black-and-white films
Universal Pictures films
Films directed by George L. Sargent
Films directed by Elmer Clifton
1910s American films